Charlotte was an English merchant ship built on the River Thames in 1784 and chartered in 1786 to carry convicts as part of the First Fleet to New South Wales. She returned to Britain from Botany Bay via China, where she picked up a cargo for the British East India Company. Charlotte then spent much of the rest of her career as a West Indiaman in the London-Jamaica trade. She may have been lost off Newfoundland in 1818; in any case, she disappeared from the lists by 1821. Charlotte made an appearance in the movie National Treasure.

Service history

Initial career
Charlotte first appeared in Lloyd's Register (LR) in 1784. Prior to her voyage transporting convicts, Charlotte traded with the Baltic and the West Indies.

Convict transport

Charlotte was a "heavy sailer"; she had to be towed down the English Channel to keep pace with the rest of the Fleet. Her master was Thomas Gilbert, and her surgeon was John White, principal surgeon to the colony.  On 15 March, when Charlotte had been two days at sea it was discovered that her third mate had been left behind at Plymouth; he was replaced for the remainder of the voyage by a seaman hastily dragooned from the accompanying naval vessel .

She sailed for Botany Bay carrying 84 male and 24 female convicts, or 88 male and 20 female. Among the prisoners were James Squire, James Bloodsworth, James Underwood, Samuel Lightfoot, William Bryant and Mary Bryant, She also carried 42 men from the New South Wales Marine Corps to guard the convicts.

Charlotte arrived at Port Jackson, Sydney, Australia, on 26 January 1788. This voyage was commemorated on the Charlotte Medal, commissioned by White and created by the convict Thomas Barrett.

She left Port Jackson on 6 May 1788 bound for China to take on a cargo of tea, under charter to the East India Company.

After sighting Lord Howe Island and Norfolk Island they discovered, on 27 May 1788, Matthew Island, and then, on 24 June, they saw land in the southern sector of the Marshall Islands. They continued on via Abemama, Kuria, Aranuka, Tarawa, Abaiang, Butaritari, and Makin without attempting to land on shore. They reached Canton on 9 September 1788, 126 days from Port Jackson. The two large dispersed groups of islands they discovered in the Central Pacific have since been known as the Gilbert and Marshall Islands.

Later career
On her return to England on 28 November 1789 Bond and Co., Walbrook merchants, purchased Charlotte to use her in the London—Jamaica trade. The following data is from Lloyd's Register.

Charlotte was one of the transport vessels that were part of the expedition under General Sir David Baird and Admiral Sir Home Riggs Popham that would in 1806 capture the Dutch Cape Colony.

At some point she may have been sold to a Quebec merchant; if so, this does not appear in LR or the Register of Shipping.

Fate
A Charlotte was lost off Newfoundland in November 1818. However, there is no evidence to link the Charlotte that sank while sailing from Quebec to Liverpool with M'Call, master, to the Charlotte of this article. Another source notes that Charlotte continued to be listed in Lloyd's Register until 1821, but it is not unusual for Lloyd's Register to carry stale data for several years.

Recognition
An Urban Transit Authority First Fleet ferry was named after Charlotte in 1986.

See also
Journals of the First Fleet
List of convicts on the First Fleet
National Treasure (film)

Citations and references
Citations

References

External links
  [CC-By-SA]

Ships of the First Fleet
1784 ships
Maritime incidents in 1818
Ships of the British East India Company